The 2014 Kilkenny Senior Hurling Championship was the 120th staging of the Kilkenny Senior Hurling Championship since its establishment in by the Kilkenny County Board in 1887. The championship began on 11 October 2014 and ended on 16 November 2014.

Clara were the defending champions. Tullaroan were relegated from the championship. Ballyhale Shamrocks won the championship following a 1-20 to 1-13 defeat of Clara.

Team changes

To Championship

Promoted from the Kilkenny Intermediate Hurling Championship
 Graigue-Ballycallan

From Championship

Relegated to the Kilkenny Intermediate Hurling Championship
 Rower-Inistioge

Results

First round

Relegation play-off

Quarter-finals

Semi-finals

Final

Championship statistics

Top scorers

Overall

In a single game

References

External links

 Kilkenny Senior Hurling Championship results

Kilkenny Senior Hurling Championship
Kilkenny Senior Hurling Championship